The 1909 Cork Intermediate Football Championship was the inaugural staging of the Cork Intermediate Football Championship since its establishment by the Cork County Board. 

The final was played on 5 December 1909 at the Athletic Grounds in Cork, between Cobh and C.Y.M.S., in what was their first ever meeting in the final. Cobh won the match by 5-13 to 0-04 to claim their first ever championship title.

Results

Final

References

Cork Intermediate Football Championship